The 2002–03 FIBA Europe Regional Challenge Cup was the one-season international European competition for men's professional basketball clubs, organised by FIBA.  At the time it was 4th-tier level competition, after the Euroleague, ULEB Cup and the FIBA Europe Champions Cup. The aim of this tournament was to provide competitive international play for clubs that would otherwise be unable to participate in international basketball. The tournament was divided in two conferences - "North" (which consisted of 17 teams) and "South" (which consisted of 11 teams). The season started on 30 October 2002, and ended on 13 February 2003. There were two champions - Azovmash from Ukraine and AEL Limassol from Cyprus.

Teams

Conference North

Regular season

Group A

Group B

Group C

Group D

Group E

Play-offs
The winner of the play-offs qualified for the FIBA Europe Regional Challenge Cup Final Four.

Conference South

Regular season

Group A

Group B

Group C

Play-offs
The winner of the play-offs qualified for the FIBA Europe Regional Challenge Cup Final Four.

References

External links
 FIBA Europe website

FIBA EuroCup Challenge
2002 in basketball
2003 in basketball